Simpson river National Reserve is a national reserve of southern Chile's Aysén del General Carlos Ibáñez del Campo Region.

References

National reserves of Chile
Protected areas of Aysén Region